Year 1159 (MCLIX) was a common year starting on Thursday (link will display the full calendar) of the Julian calendar.

Events 
<onlyinclude>
 September 7 – Pope Alexander III succeeds Pope Adrian IV, as the 170th pope.
 The Heiji Rebellion breaks out in Japan.
 Tunis is reconquered from the Normans, by the Almohad caliphs.
 (Approximate date): Churchman Richard FitzNeal is appointed Lord High Treasurer in England, in charge of Henry II of England's Exchequer, an office he will hold for almost 40 years.

Births 
 Minamoto no Yoshitsune, Japanese general (d. 1189)

Deaths 
 May 30 – Wladislaus II, the Exile of Poland (b. 1105)
 August 29 – Bertha of Sulzbach, Byzantine Empress (b. 1110s)
 September 1 – Pope Adrian IV (b. c. 1100)
 October 11 – William of Blois, Count of Boulogne and Earl of Surrey (b. c. 1137)
 Joscelin II, Count of Edessa

References